Mila Johanna Kajas (born 30 January 1972) is a Finnish former competitive figure skater. She won seven international medals, including silver at the 1993 Grand Prix International de Paris, and four Finnish national titles. Her best ISU Championship results were 11th at the 1994 Worlds in Chiba, Japan, and 10th at the 1996 Europeans in Sofia, Bulgaria. She placed 12th at the 1994 Winter Olympics in Lillehammer.

She married Jarkko Virtanen in 1997 and gave birth to a daughter, Ilona, in January 2004.

Results

References

Finnish female single skaters
Olympic figure skaters of Finland
Figure skaters at the 1994 Winter Olympics
1972 births
Living people
Sportspeople from Lahti
20th-century Finnish women